Tetrahydrosarcinapterin synthase (H4MPT:alpha-L-glutamate ligase, MJ0620, MptN protein) is an enzyme with systematic name tetrahydromethanopterin:alpha-L-glutamate ligase (ADP-forming). This enzyme catalyses the following chemical reaction

 ATP + tetrahydromethanopterin + L-glutamate  ADP + phosphate + 5,6,7,8-tetrahydrosarcinapterin

This enzyme catalyses the biosynthesis of 5,6,7,8-tetrahydrosarcinapterin.

References

External links 
 

EC 6.3.2